Pierre Sabatie is a French former professional rugby league footballer who played for the Villeneuve Leopards in the Elite One Championship. He is a France international.

He was named in the France training squad for the 2008 Rugby League World Cup.

References

External links
Rinaldi to Captain France

Living people
French rugby league players
Villeneuve Leopards players
Year of birth missing (living people)